The Soviet War Memorial in Vienna, more formally known  as the Heroes' Monument of the Red Army, is located at Vienna's Schwarzenbergplatz. The semi-circular white marble colonnade partially enclosing a twelve-metre figure of a Soviet soldier was unveiled in 1945. The Heroes' Monument of the Red Army in Vienna was built to commemorate the 17,000 Red Army soldiers killed in action during the Vienna offensive in World War II.

Background

Near the end of World War II in Europe, Soviet forces of the 3rd Ukrainian Front were ordered by Joseph Stalin to capture Vienna, both for strategic military purposes and for use as a post-war bargaining chip with the Allies. After intense urban fighting, Vienna was captured by the Soviet Forces on 14 April 1945.

Construction and Austrian perception 

The creation of an Allied Commission for Austria was envisaged by Allied leaders at the various sessions of the European Advisory Commission and established by the Agreement on control machinery in Austria in London on July 4, 1945. The agreement mandated the creation of four occupation zones (American, British, French and Soviet) in Vienna, similar to Berlin. Perhaps not coincidentally, although several sites were considered for the Soviet memorial, ultimately a prominent location in the 3rd district near the Palais Schwarzenberg was chosen, imposingly within sight of the location used by the four allies to govern Vienna. German prisoners of war and Austrian construction workers were used to build the  site.

The memorial includes a triumphal arch and is dominated by the figure of a soldier with a PPSh-41 submachine gun on his chest. The soldier wears a golden helmet and holds a Soviet flag and a golden Emblem of the Soviet Union. Russian President Vladimir Putin visited the memorial in 2007 to lay flowers and specifically give thanks to Austria for maintaining it.  The city paid to refurbish the memorial, despite objections from certain members of the local press.

Vandalism
The monument has been attacked by acts of politically inspired vandalism increasingly in the 21st Century. 

 In April 2012 red paint was thrown over a part of the memorial.
 In May 2014 it was daubed with the colours of the Ukrainian flag during the onset of the Russo-Ukrainian War.
 In February 2015 black paint was poured over an order on the monument from Joseph Stalin congratulating Soviet Forces on their victory in the Vienna Offensive in 1945.

Stone tablet text

The text of the stone tablet in front of the monument begins:

See also
 Soviet War Memorial (Treptower Park)
 Soviet War Memorial (Tiergarten)
 Soviet War Memorial (Schönholzer Heide)

References

Soviet military memorials and cemeteries
1940s in Vienna
Buildings and structures in Vienna
Tourist attractions in Vienna
Austria–Soviet Union relations
Austria–Russia relations
Monuments and memorials in Austria
Outdoor sculptures in Austria
Vandalized works of art